The USA Warriors are a U.S.-based ice hockey team consisting of veterans wounded or injured during their service to the nation.  The team provides athletic opportunities for wounded soldiers.

The team's mission is outlined on their website as follows:

The USA Warriors Ice Hockey Program has been organized to operate exclusively for charitable and educational purposes, for those wounded in defense of the United States in conjunction with the USA Hockey Disabled Hockey Program. The Program’s mission is to organize and administer an ice hockey program that provides a recreational, therapeutic experience and education. Some of the programs purposes include, but are not limited to:
 encourage the formation of “USA Warrior Hockey Programs” locally and nationally;
 educate, train, motivate, and encourage individuals who have physical disabilities incurred during service to the United States to participate in the sport of ice hockey in an environment that is adapted to the level of ability of the participating athletes;
 integrate people with disabilities with people without disabilities in order to promote awareness of challenges and to encourage teambuilding;
 use the game of hockey to assist individuals with disabilities in developing self-confidence, adjusting to their new lifestyle, rehabilitation, self-reliance, concentration, and to assist in helping participants back into mainstream lifestyles they were accustomed to prior to their disability, that will help the individual be more successful both within and outside a hockey environment;
 educate and encourage the general public about disability sports and USA Warriors Ice Hockey in particular and to promote societal awareness of the sacrifices participants made in defense of our nation.

The Warriors are split into two teams:
 Stand-up
 Sled hockey

Events

In March 2015 the Warriors traveled to Chicago to take part in a series of events in support of the Clint Reif Memorial Fund. In January 2015 the Warriors took part in events surrounding the NHL Winter Classic in Washington DC.

The team is staffed by volunteers and receives support from numerous organizations, including the NHL, USA Hockey, and the Washington Capitals. Annually the team plays a fundraiser match against the team founded by the US Congress.  In 2012, this game was attended by the Chief of Staff of the U.S. Army.

Controversies
In 2017, the Usa Warriors Logo was denied a trademark by the United States Trademark and Patent Office on the ground that logo resembles that of USA Hockey and design and that may play a crucial role in the likelihood of confusion.

In 2018, news broke that a Michael Cain, member of the Usa Warriors Sled Team was a sex offender, and spent time with NHL Stars through the Usa Warriors program after his conviction. Cain was featured by the Warriors' in several times, including The Hockey Writers and the Department of Defence. During events with the Usa Warriors, Cain traveled with the team, and partook in events, to include events in schools.

In 2018, an active member of the USA Warriors Ice Hockey Program, Robert MacSeain, was arrested on child porn charges.

References

Ice hockey teams in the United States
Parasports organizations in the United States
Military sport in the United States